Stephen I Kotromanić (1242–1314) was a Bosnian Ban from 1287 to 1290 jointly with Ban Prijezda II and 1290–1314 alone as a vassal of the Kingdom of Hungary. He is the eponymous founder of the Bosnian ruling dynasty, the House of Kotromanić.

Origin
His ancestry is not known precisely. It is believed that he was the son of a German nobleman Gotfrid, founder of the family he belonged to Kelad went to strengthen the Hungarian hold in Bosnia in 1162 or 1163. This German nobleman co-signed the edicts for Bosnia in the Split Church in 1163 with the Hungarian King Stephen IV. Apparently, the Hungarian King Stephen III invited him to place him as a regional ruler in Hungary's name because of his ancestor's successes. Kotroman ruled as a vassal of this King. Mauro Orbini claimed in his work The Kingdom of Slavs that the Ragusan document refers to him as " Cotrumano Goto", i.e. Kotroman the German but it's unclear from where did Orbini make this reference. It has also been speculated that Kotroman might have been a son of Bosnian Ban Prijezda I.

Biography

Before Banate
Since 1287, when his father, Ban Prijezda I withdrew from power, Kotroman ruled jointly as Ban of Bosnia with another son of Prijezda I, Prijezda II. Kotroman separated the country with Prijezda II, and took eastern Bosnia. After the death of Prijezda II, Kotroman became the sole Ban of Bosnia in 1290.

Marriage
In 1284 he married Elizabeth of Serbia, daughter of the King of Syrmia, Stefan Dragutin of the House of Nemanjić, and Queen Catherine, daughter of Hungarian King Stephen V and Elizabeth the Cuman. Dragutin had already controlled two banates in Bosnia: Usora and Soli and Kotroman immediately fell under his influence – many of his acts were at Dragutin's command. The marriage was political and arranged by Ban Prijezda II who had attempted to forge an alliance with Stefan Dragutin.

Hungarian War of Succession
In 1290 Hungarian King Ladislaus IV died leaving no heirs to the throne. The cousin of Ladislaus IV, Andrew III, was crowned King, despite the desire of the sister of the former King Ladislaus IV, Mary of Hungary, Queen of Naples, who wanted her son, Charles Martel as the new King in Hungary. The latter party had much more support, so Pope Nicholas IV had crowned Charles Martel as King of Hungary. This movement was supported by the most powerful Croatian nobility, the Šubićs, Princes of Bribir. As the current head of the family, Paul Šubić was also son-in-law of King Stefan Dragutin, family connections made Kotroman support Charles Martel's crowning. To increase his influence in Kotroman's realm, Charles Martel issued numerous edicts to split the land among the lesser gentry to gain support for his reign. It appears that he gave the reign over Bosnia to the Šubićs. Charles Martel died unexpectedly in 1295, before the campaign to seize the power in Hungary was finished. The Queen of Naples and sister of former King Ladislaus IV, Mary, had then decided to put her grandson, son of Charles Martel, Charles Robert as the future King of Hungary. Pope Boniface VIII declared the twelve-year-old boy as King Charles I of Hungary in 1297. Paul Šubić of Croatia declared himself as "Dominus of Bosnia" in 1299 and gave the title of Bosnian Ban to his brother, Mladen I Šubić. All of Kotroman's land except for the Lower Edges, which was ruled by Prince Hrvatin Stjepanić as a vassal of the Šubićs, was held by the House of Šubić; as was confirmed by Charles I Robert. Paul Šubić wanted to bring King Charles Robert to Split across Croatia to Zagreb, which would become the main station of his campaign against King Andrew III of Hungary. During the preparations for war, Andrew III died unexpectedly. Charles Robert assessed the Hungarian throne, but had to fight numerous opponents to his regime up to 1309.

Internal wars
Stephen Kotroman had resisted the growth of the Šubićs' power in Bosnia, but had lost by 1302 most control over the land to Mladen I Šubić. Although, Kotroman was not defeated as he still had some influence and power in Bosnia. His father-in-law King Stefan Dragutin could not send him aid since a succession-war had erupted in the Serbian Kingdom between him and his brother, the powerful King Stefan Milutin. Additionally, during the problems over the Hungarian crown, Dragutin had attempted to insert his son Vladislav as the new King of Hungary.

Despite the many difficulties, Stephen Kotroman had held out. The war turned into religious conflict, as Mladen I Šubić had started a campaign to exterminate the adherents of the Bosnian Church – the kristjani. This balanced the conflict in Kotroman's favour, as number of kristjani had joined his side because of this. After his death Paul Šubić in 1305 proclaimed himself "lord of All Bosnia".

End of reign
Paul's reign did not last long as he died in 1312. The disappointed Ban Stephen Kotroman died in 1314, before he managed to act.

Children
Stephen and Elisabeth had six children:
 Vladislaus
 Ninoslaus
 Stephen
 another son
 Catherine, married Prince Nicholas of Zahumlje in 1338
 Mary

Stephen II was to succeed Kotroman as Bosnian Ban; but had to flee to the Republic of Ragusa to hide from the Šubićs with his brothers and their mother, Elizabeth.

References

Sources

External links
Stjepan I Kotroman Ban of Bosnia 1242 - 1316 - The Douglas Archives (in English)

Stephen 01, Ban of Bosnia
1242 births
1314 deaths
Stephen 01, Ban of Bosnia
Stephen 01, Ban of Bosnia
Stephen 01, Ban of Bosnia
People of the Banate of Bosnia